Mahidevran Hatun ("lucky's moon",  1500 – 3 February 1581; also known as Gülbahar Hatun, "spring rose") was a concubine of Suleiman the Magnificent of the Ottoman Empire and the mother of Şehzade Mustafa. After Suleiman ascended the throne in 1520 and his first son, Şehzade Mahmud, died a month after the ascension, Mahidevran acquired the rank of mother of the Sultan's eldest son.

Etymology 
Mahidevran's name means "one who is always beautiful", "one whose beauty never fades" or "beauty of the times" in Persian. Another meaning of her name is "Moon of Fortune." Some sources name her Gülbahar, with gül meaning 'rose' and bahar meaning 'spring' in Turkish and Persian.

Title and status 
Mahidevran was the mother of Şehzade Mustafa, the eldest surviving son of the reigning Sultan. She held a prominent position in the harem of her son in Manisa. While Hürrem Sultan became Suleiman's favorite and legal wife, Mahidevran retained the status of the mother of Suleiman's eldest son, and was referred to as Suleiman's "first wife" by some diplomats, despite the fact that they were never married. Until Hürrem Sultan, was given the title of "Sultan" and later "Haseki Sultan", a new title created for her, all consorts had the title of 'Hatun', meaning lady. Therefore Mahidevran never had the title of Sultana in the hierarchy of the harem, although as the mother of the eldest son she still had the rank of Baş Kadın.

Origins and early life 
Little is known of Mahidevran's early life. Her ethnic background is a matter of controversy. She was either an Albanian or Circassian. Theories of her origins are:

According to some contemporary Venetian sources, she was of Circassian origin.
The name of Mahidevran's father, given in contemporary documents as Abdullah, Abdürrahman. or Abdülmennan, suggests she was a Muslim convert slave of an unknown origin.
According to Nicolae Iorga, and in accordance with some (unidentified) accounts, in which she was of "Montenegrin origin", she was from Montenegro.

Life with Suleiman 

She was listed among the seventeen women of the harem of Suleiman while he was governor of Manisa; she was not a highly ranked consort, as she earned 4 aspers a day along with two other concubines, while three others earned 5 aspers. Mahidevran gave birth to her only child, Mustafa who was born in 1515 while they were in Manisa where Suleiman was the sanjak ruler.

When Selim I died in 1520, Suleiman moved to Istanbul, the capital of the Ottoman Empire, along with his family to ascend the throne. In the same year, Suleiman lost his two other sons, nine-year-old Mahmud and the new born Murad (the only daughter born to date, Raziye Sultan, also died), Mustafa became the eldest of his princely generation. This gave Mahidevran an elevated position, but early in Suleiman's reign, Mahidevran encountered a new rival, Hürrem, who soon became Suleiman's favourite and later his Haseki and legal wife. It was recorded by Bernardo Navagero that Suleiman highly cherished Mahidevran in the Topkapi Harem along with Hürrem. But by 1526, he had stopped paying attention to Mahidevran and devoted his full affection to Hürrem.

Hürrem gave birth to her first son Mehmed in 1521 and then Selim (future Sultan Selim II) in 1524, destroying Mahidevran's status of being the mother of the Sultan's only son. The rivalry between the two women was partially suppressed by Hafsa Sultan, Suleiman's mother. According to Navagero's report, as a result of the bitter rivalry a fight between the two women broke out, with Mahidevran beating Hürrem, which angered Suleiman. According to Necdet Sakaoğlu, a Turkish historian, these accusations were not truthful. Mahidevran left Istanbul with her son Mustafa due to his appointment as sanjak bey (governor) of Manisa province and upon his death in 1553 she went into refuge in Bursa, where she eventually died. Conversely, Hürrem stayed in the palace while her sons were sent for to govern provinces as Sanjak-bey.

Foreign observers of the Ottomans, especially the ambassadors of the Venetian Republic followed Ottoman dynastic politics closely; their comments about Mahidevran glimpses of the vital role played by a prince's mother and of her necessary devotion to this welfare. Pietro Bragadin, ambassador in the early years of Suleiman's reign, reported that while both were still resident in the imperial palace in Istanbul, Mustafa was his mother's "whole joy".

Mustafa's provincial posts 
According to Turkish tradition, all princes were expected to work as provincial governors (Sanjak-bey) as a part of their training. Mustafa was sent to Manisa in 1533, in the formal ceremony and Mahidevran accompanied him. Describing his court at Kara Amid (Diyarbakır) near the Safavid border, Bassano wrote around 1540 that the prince had "a most wonderful and glorious court, no less than that of his father" and that "his mother, who was with him, instructs him in how to make himself loved by the people." At some point Mustafa returned to Manisa, and in 1542 he moved to Amasya. By 1546 three more of Suleiman's sons were in the field, and the competition for the succession began among the four princes, although the sultan would live for another twenty years. The ambassador Bernado Navagero, in a 1553 report, described Mahidevran's efforts to protect her son: "Mustafa has with him his mother, who exercises great diligence to guard him from poisoning and reminds him everyday that he has nothing else but this to avoid, and it is said that he has boundless respect and reverence for her."

Mustafa was an immensely popular prince. When he was only nine, that Venetian ambassador had reported that "he has extraordinary talent, he will be warrior, is much loved by the Janissaries, and performs great feats." In 1553, when Mustafa was thirty eight years old, Navagero wrote, "It is impossible to describe how much he is loved and desired by all as successor to the throne." The rumours and speculations said that, towards the end of Suleiman's long reign, the rivalry between his sons became evident and furthermore, both Hürrem and the grand vizier Rüstem Pasha turned him against Mustafa and Mustafa was accused of causing unrest. However, there is no evidence of such a conspiracy. During the campaign against Safavid Persia in 1553, Suleiman ordered the execution of Mustafa on charges of planning to dethrone his father; his guilt for the treason of which he was accused has since been neither proven nor disproven.

As per Ottoman tradition, Mahidevran was at the head of Mustafa's princely harem. Up until the very end of her son's life, she endeavored to protect Mustafa from his political rivals, and most probably maintained a network of informants in order to do so. The ambassador Trevisano related in 1554 that on the day Mustafa was executed, Mahidevran had sent a messenger warning him of his father's plans to kill him. Mustafa unfortunately ignored the message; according to Trevisano, he had consistently refused to heed the warnings of his friends and even his mother.

Later years and death

For several years after her son's execution, Mahidevran lived a troubled life. She went to Bursa, where her son Mustafa was buried and became the last concubine to retire to Bursa. Less fortunate than her predecessors and presumably disgraced by her son's execution, she was unable to pay the rent on the house in which she lived, and her servants were taunted and cheated in the local markets. Mahidevran's situation improved when her debts were paid and a house was purchased for her by Selim II, Mustafa's half brother and Suleiman's successor, when he ascended the throne. Financially secure at last, Mahidevran had enough income to create an endowment for the upkeep of her son's tomb.

Mahidevran died on 3 February 1581, outliving Suleiman and all of his children, and was buried in Mustafa's tomb.

Depictions in literature and popular culture
 In the 2003 TV miniseries, Hürrem Sultan, Mahidevran was played by Turkish actress Hatice Aslan. 
 In the 2011–2014 TV series Muhteşem Yüzyıl, Mahidevran is portrayed by Turkish actress Nur Fettahoğlu. Due to many error of historical reconstruction in the series, here she is called Haseki Mahidevran Sultan, although the real Mahidevran never bore either title.

See also
Ottoman Empire
Ottoman dynasty
List of consorts of the Ottoman Sultans

Notes

References

Bibliography 

1490s births
1581 deaths
16th-century consorts of Ottoman sultans
Suleiman the Magnificent